Eumenogaster pseudosphecia is a moth of the subfamily Arctiinae. It was described by George Hampson in 1898. It is found in the Amazon region.

References

 

Arctiinae
Moths described in 1898